Samuel Wilson Catron (May 11, 1953 – April 13, 2002) was sheriff of Pulaski County, Kentucky. On the evening of April 13, 2002, Catron was assassinated by Danny Shelley after he finished a campaign speech at a fish fry and political rally being held at the Shopville-Stab, Kentucky Volunteer Fire Department in the small community of Stab, Kentucky. Sheriff Catron was running for a fifth term as sheriff. His former deputy, Jeff Morris, who was campaigning against him, and Kenneth White, a well-known drug dealer, conspired to commit the murder. He is buried at Somerset Cemetery in Somerset, Kentucky, along with other relatives. A memorial for Sam Catron can be viewed by the public directly across from the fire department, where Catron fell beside his police cruiser.

Biography

Catron graduated from Somerset High School in 1971. His career in law enforcement began in the mid 1970s as a Pulaski County sheriff's deputy. Sam quit in 1981 after Johnny Adams was elected sheriff. In 1982, Catron became the chief of police for Ferguson, Kentucky, leaving the position in 1985 after being elected sheriff of Pulaski County. He held the office the rest of his days. During his tenure, Catron served on the Kentucky Governor's Task Force for Marijuana Eradication, the Pulaski County Rescue Squad, the Appalachian High Density Drug Traffic Area task force, was a member of the National Sheriffs' Association and was named Sheriff of the Year in 1989. Sheriff Catron was well known as an enemy of drug traffickers, flying a helicopter to search for marijuana plants and filling courtrooms with offenders his department had nabbed. In his private life, Catron served on the board of his local Boy Scout troop, was a Vigil life member and past chief of the Kawida Lodge Order of the Arrow, Boy Scouts of America.

Assassination

Pulaski County Sheriff Sam Catron was killed as a result of a plot concocted by Kenneth White and Jeff Morris. White and Morris influenced Danny Shelley, an OxyContin addict, to carry out their plot. White, who had recently been a DEA informant, led the gullible Shelley to believe that Catron was on the verge of arresting him. The plan called for Shelley to use Morris' motorcycle to escape after he shot Catron, and to meet with Morris and White later. However, Morris' real plan was to meet up with Shelley, kill him under a pretense of self-defense, and pin all of the blame for Catron's death on Shelley. Morris hoped this would make him a local hero and ensure his election as sheriff. After the election, White would then run the county with Morris as his puppet. The plot, which they had conceived earlier that day while at Wal-Mart in Somerset, backfired. Catron was campaigning at the Shopville Fire Department.  As he opened the trunk of his vehicle, Shelley opened fire.  Shelley stopped at the ridge line overlooking the Shopville Fire Department and was immediately spotted by law enforcement.  During the ensuing pursuit, Shelley took a wrong turn and wrecked Morris' motorcycle. Shelley was found at the scene of the accident by local hero David Hoff, who subdued him until authorities arrived. After he was caught, he quickly implicated Morris, who, in turn, implicated White. All three were sent to prison.  Kenneth White was a prisoner of Kentucky State Reformatory until his death in November, 2018. Shelley is serving a life sentence at Little Sandy Correctional Complex in Sandy Hook.

Profiles

Catron's murder was profiled in an episode of the A&E Network's City Confidential, examining the town of Somerset, Kentucky, and was also explored in a third-season episode of Investigation Discovery's Sins and Secrets.

References
Obituary
CNN Article

1953 births
2002 deaths
People from Pulaski County, Kentucky
Kentucky sheriffs
American municipal police chiefs
Assassinated American people
Place of birth missing
Deaths by firearm in Kentucky
People murdered in Kentucky
20th-century American politicians